Racing fuel can refer to many different common fuels used in motorsports:
Leaded gasoline, formerly used by the NASCAR series and other motorsports
Use of leaded gasoline in NASCAR
Nitromethane and methanol fuel, used by Top Fuel drag racing
Methanol fuel, formerly used in some open-wheel race cars, like IndyCar Series prior to 2007 and in Top Alcohol drag racing
Ethanol fuel, now being used in the IndyCar Series and NASCAR 
Nitrous, used by drag racing vehicles to increase horsepower